Tony O’Dell (born January 30, 1960) is an American actor. He is best known for his role as Cobra Kai member Jimmy in the 1984 film The Karate Kid, and the second season of its spinoff Cobra Kai (the 2018 YouTube web series based on the adult lives of the Karate Kid characters), and as preppy Alan Pinkard on the ABC sitcom Head of the Class (1986–91).

Early life and career
O'Dell was born Anthony Dell'Aquila in Pasadena, California, and graduated from St. Francis High School. His first television appearance was a 1978 episode of the NBC television series CHiPs, titled "Trick or Treat." He later appeared in the short lived 1985  CBS science fiction series Otherworld, as Trace Sterling. One of his longest roles was of high school student Alan Pinkard on the ABC sitcom Head of the Class (1986–91). He later appeared in Suddenly Susan, The George Lopez Show, and K.C. Undercover.

In 1984, he portrayed Cobra Kai member Jimmy, in the first two  Karate Kid films, and appeared in the 2007 music video for the song Sweep the Leg by No More Kings as a caricature of himself and Jimmy from The Karate Kid. O'Dell reprised the role of Jimmy during the 2019 Season 2 YouTube web series Cobra Kai.

Selected filmography

Movies

Television

References

External links
 

1960 births
American male film actors
American male television actors
Living people
Male actors from California